Lovina Beach (or often simply Lovina) is a coastal area on the northwestern side of the island of Bali, Indonesia. The coastal strip stretches from 5 km west of the city of Singaraja to 15 km west. Singaraja is the seat of Buleleng Regency. The Lovina area contains the small villages (from east to west) of Pemaron, Tukad Mungga, Anturan,  Banyualit, Kalibukbuk, Kaliasem and Temukus. Although it has become more popular with tourists, it remains far quieter than the tourist hotspots of the island's south side.

The area takes its name from a home owned by Pandji Tisna (1908-1978), a Regent of Buleleng and pioneer of tourism to Bali in the early 1950s.

Popular activities for visitors include diving, snorkeling, and early-morning boat trips off the coast to see dolphins.  These dolphin sighting trips usually last about two hours, and generally cost anywhere between 60,000–250,000 Indonesian rupiah, or about US$5–$20.

Gallery

References

External links 

Landforms of Bali
Beaches of Indonesia
Tourist attractions in Bali
Beaches of Bali